WRQN is an American radio station licensed to broadcast from Bowling Green, Ohio.  Though licensed to Bowling Green, its primary market and its studios are in the nearby city of Toledo. The station broadcasts at 93.5 on the FM dial, and plays classic hits music. Its transmitter is located near Haskins, Ohio.

Overview
Before becoming WRQN on July 11, 1983, the station was WAWR, founded by Port Clinton, Ohio resident Robert W. Reider. The station first went on the air on Wednesday, June 3, 1964. Reider eventually started and operated WAWR, WRWR in Port Clinton, WLKR in Norwalk, and WKTN in Kenton, all via his "Ohio Radio Incorporated" banner.

WAWR programmed easy listening music during the day and rock in the evenings changing to contemporary rock and underground rock in the evenings with Bob Ladd, geared toward the college students at local BGSU. Earl Sharninghouse (aka Rick Allen) had the oldies weekend show playing 1950s and 1960s oldies in the evenings in the mid-1960s. Steve Wright held the morning slot with Terry Waltz anchoring the news and news director. Jim (Marick) Obrien worked part-time in production and occasional on air talent. General Manager Jerry (Tschappit) McCullen conducted local talks shows at local restaurants.

Eventually, the call sign was changed to WKIQ.  When it became WRQN the station began as a Rock/Top 40 (Contemporary Hits Radio - CHR) as "Toledo's New Rock, The All-New 93 and a 1/2 FM WRQN", playing mix of artists like Robert Plant, The Motels, The Police, Donna Summer, Quarterflash, Air Supply, Culture Club and Billy Squier. The station later called itself "Hit Rock, Hit Radio, 93Q". Despite its weaker (3000 watts) signal, the station became very successful and competed with then (50,000 watts) 92.5 WMHE. The daily on-air lineup included (Steve) Mason, Diane and The Q Morning Zoo, Brad Hanson, Joe Thomas, Ted Kelly, and Scott Greggory. Eventually, former intern turned local personality favorite Johny D was heard in the evenings, hosting a show called "Dial D" in which most of the time was spent taking phone calls from listeners and rapping about anything the listeners wanted to talk about.

Around 1990 the station boosted their transmitting power to 6,000 watts. It also aired syndicated programs like "Future Hits", "Casey's Top 40", and "Saturday Night Hot Mix". The station also had its own program that aired on Sunday nights called "93Q's On The Edge" that played alternative rock that had not yet reached the mainstream.

On October 17, 1991, instead of hearing The Q Morning Zoo, WRQN was playing "Louie Louie" by The Kingsmen over and over, similar to the way WHNN in Saginaw, Michigan did before it changed to an oldies format on Labor Day of 1990, referring to itself as "Louie 93.5, All Louie, All the Time!". The station also played a marching band rendition of the song during this stunting. On the following Monday, Mason and Diane returned to talk about the new format change to oldies. There was an enormous backlash from the listeners, many of them signing petitions demanding the return of 93Q.

Mason talked about this but said that they were "fighting for a lost cause", and that the station was not changing back. Mason and Diane remained at the station for a little while longer and then left. For a majority of the 1990s, the station was known as "WRQN Oldies 93.5", focusing on mostly music from the 1950s and 1960s.

By the 2000s WRQN began adding more 1970s classic hits and Motown, then WRQN removed most 1950s doo wop hits from their playlist.

The year 2006 saw even more improvements at WRQN-FM, as transmitter power was increased to 7,000 watts, a new tower was built, and the station was the first in the Toledo market to broadcast with HD-Radio.  Toledo radio legend Bob Kelly (who joined the station after the switch to oldies) was inducted into the Ohio Radio Hall of Fame in October 2006. The lineup at the time on WRQN featured long-time Toledo radio favorites Jim Brady, Ron Finn, Buddy Carr, as well as Bob Kelly with his new partner Becky Shock (replacing Bob's sidekick of 19 years, Dennis Staples).

On Friday, June 10, 2011, longtime radio host Bob Kelly retired, as did the morning show "Bob and Becky". The following Monday, June 13, 2011, a new morning show was introduced, "Ron and Lyn",  formerly the morning show on WWWM-FM. Ron Finn previously hosted the 10a-2p shift on WRQN which former morning show personality, Becky Shock hosted for sometime. Finn's counterpart in the morning, Lyn Casye still aired on Star 105.5's new morning show, "Tim and Jeff" offering news, weather, and traffic updates.

Then on Monday, June 13, 2011, WRQN slightly updated its programming. WRQN now advertises themselves as "Feel Good Favorites" and removed most 1960s hits from their playlist and added 1980s pop music hits to the playlist, including hits from George Michael, Prince, Soft Cell, Michael Jackson, Heart (band), Level 42, Mr. Mister and many others. Previously, WRQN offered "Rock & Roll Hits" mainly from the 1960s and 1970s.

These days, Denny Schaffer hosts the morning drive followed by Timm Morrison (mid-days), Becky Shock (PM drive), and Johny D (evenings).

External links
Station website

RQN
Radio stations established in 1983
Cumulus Media radio stations